Rind is a village in the Areni Municipality of the Vayots Dzor Province in Armenia, 1320 m above sea level, 25 km west of the regional center.

Geography 
Rind is located on a peninsula descending to the Arpa valley of the Vardenis mountain range. The largest water object of the village is Yeghegnalich, the surface of which is 2.12 hectares, and the absolute height of the mirror is 1458 meters.

History 
The village of Rind was founded in the early 1800s. In 1967, due to a landslide, the old village was depopulated, the residents moved 3 km west and founded the current village in the "Tap" area.

Gallery

References

External links 

Populated places in Vayots Dzor Province